Southern Railway 630 is a 2-8-0 "Consolidation" type steam locomotive built in February 1904 by the American Locomotive Company (ALCO) of Richmond, Virginia for the Southern Railway as a member of the Ks-1 class. It is currently owned and operated by the Tennessee Valley Railroad Museum (TVRM) in Chattanooga, Tennessee where it resides today for use on excursion trains.

History

Design and upgrades
It was originally built with Stephenson valve gear, sliding valves, alligator crossheads, and a saturated boiler. In 1917, the locomotive was upgraded with Southern valve gear, piston valves, along with the boiler equipped with superheaters which reclassified No. 630 as a "Ks" type. In the 1920s, it had more upgrades added such as new cylinders and valve assemblies, which allow the locomotive to develop  of tractive effort and reclassified again as a "Ks-1" type. Sometimes during the 1940s, No. 630 was re-equipped with multiple-bearing crossheads.

Revenue service
No. 630 was first assigned to local and branch line service in the Knoxville division by the Southern Railway, before it was moved to the Asheville division to run on the Murphy and Lake Toxaway branch lines, until it was retired from revenue freight service in August 1952. In November 1952, No. 630 and sister locomotive No. 722 were both sold to the East Tennessee and Western North Carolina Railroad (ET&WNC), where they were served as switchers around Johnson City and Elizabethton, Tennessee. After the ET&WNC's acquirement, Nos. 630 and 722 were renumbered to 207 and 208, respectively and had their tender coal bunker cut down to give the engineer a clear view during numerous switching moves and reverse operation.

First excursion service
In late 1967, Nos. 207 and 208 were both traded back to the Southern Railway for use in their steam excursion program in return for a pair of former Central of Georgia ALCO RS-3s. Retrieving their old numbers, No. 630 had been given minor repairs and began excursion service in February 1968, while No. 722 had its firebox repaired and returned to operating service in August 1970.

Nos. 630 and 722 pulled many main line excursion trains for the Southern steam program until they were both loaned to the Tennessee Valley Railroad Museum (TVRM) in 1978 and 1980, respectively to make way for larger superpower steam locomotives such as Canadian Pacific 2839, Texas and Pacific 610 and Chesapeake and Ohio 2716 to pull the longer and heavier excursions.

In November 1985, No. 722 was taken out of service for its boiler ticket certificate and was moved by Southern's successor, Norfolk Southern (NS) to be on display in Asheville, North Carolina, in 1992. In November 1989, No. 630 was taken out of service and put in storage when TVRM was restored another 2-8-0 steam locomotive ex-U.S. Army No. 610 at the time.

Second excursion service
In 1999, Norfolk Southern donated No. 630 to TVRM, and over the next 12 years, the locomotive was overhauled and restored at a cost of almost $700,000. This was one of the most extensive steam locomotive overhauls as it required massive repairs to its frame, running gear, and boiler along with the flues and superheaters replaced. No. 630 was also given a newly welded smokebox and a new tender, which was originally behind Southern Railway No. 4501 and replaced No. 630's original tender, which was in very poor condition to be rebuilt. The locomotive returned to operating service on March 14, 2011, and kicked off the 21st Century Steam program instituted by Norfolk Southern.

For four years, No. 630 has pulled many public and private excursions throughout the eastern United States for the 21st Century Steam program in Alabama, Georgia, Kentucky, North Carolina, Ohio, South Carolina, Tennessee, Virginia, and West Virginia. It also visited the North Carolina Transportation Museum in Spencer, North Carolina, two times in 2012 and 2013.

By late 2015, Norfolk Southern had officially discontinued their steam program, although No. 630 continues regular operations, hauling the Missionary Ridge Local excursions at TVRM on weekends and occasionally double heads with No. 4501 for the Summerville Steam Special to Summerville, Georgia.

Gallery

See also
Great Smoky Mountains Railroad 1702
McCloud Railway 25
Norfolk and Western 475
Polson Logging Co. 2
Southern Railway 154
Southern Railway 385
Southern Railway 401
W. Graham Claytor Jr.

Notes

References

Bibliography

External links

Southern 630 Steam Engine

Individual locomotives of the United States
2-8-0 locomotives
Steam locomotives of Southern Railway (U.S.)
ALCO locomotives
Railway locomotives introduced in 1904
Standard gauge locomotives of the United States
Preserved steam locomotives of Tennessee